Ardnamurchan Lighthouse is a listed 19th century lighthouse, located on Ardnamurchan Point in Lochaber part of the Highland council area of Scotland. The lighthouse with its , pink granite tower was completed in 1849 to a design by Alan Stevenson. It is the only lighthouse in the UK built in the Egyptian style. Mains electricity was installed in 1976, the light was automated in 1988 and is now operated remotely by the Northern Lighthouse Board from Edinburgh.

The former keepers' cottages and outbuildings are owned by the Ardnamurchan Lighthouse Trust and operated as a visitor centre, with a museum called the 'Kingdom of Light' - Rioghachd na Sorcha. Exhibits detail the history and operations of the lighthouse, including access to the restored engine room and workshop with the original fog horn.  Other displays include the geology and natural history of the area, and local social history and culture.

A part-time light keeper is retained by the Northern Lighthouse Board who is based at Ardnamurchan and who also looks after Rubha nan Gall and Corran Point lighthouses. Less maintenance is required with the introduction of LED lights. At Ardnamurchan the power is only 48 watts although in 2019 it was increased to 72 watts.

The last part of the computer game Sherlock Holmes: The Awakened takes place in this lighthouse.

In 2021, the lighthouse was featured in an episode of British motoring television programme Top Gear, where the presenters raced three off-road vehicles to deliver and fit a new light bulb.

See also

List of lighthouses in Scotland
List of Northern Lighthouse Board lighthouses
List of Category A listed buildings in Highland

References

External links

 Northern Lighthouse Board 
 Ardnamurchan Lighthouse Trust

Lighthouses completed in 1849
Category A listed lighthouses
Museums in Highland (council area)
Lighthouse museums in the United Kingdom
Maritime museums in Scotland
Local museums in Scotland
Category A listed buildings in Highland (council area)
1849 establishments in Scotland
Ardnamurchan